The 1975 Illinois Fighting Illini football team was an American football team that represented the University of Illinois during the 1975 Big Ten Conference football season.  In their fifth year under head coach Bob Blackman, the Illini compiled a 5–6 record and finished in a three-way tie for third place in the Big Ten Conference.

The team's offensive leaders were quarterback Kurt Steger with 1,136 passing yards, running back Lonnie Perrin with 907 rushing yards, and wide receiver Frank Johnson with 349 receiving yards. Offensive tackle Stu Levenick and defensive back Bruce Beaman were selected as the team's most valuable players.

Schedule

Roster

References

Illinois
Illinois Fighting Illini football seasons
Illinois Fighting Illini football